Goodradigbee River, a perennial stream that is part of the Murrumbidgee catchment within the Murray-Darling basin, is located in the Snowy Mountains district of New South Wales, Australia.

Course and features

The majority of the catchment (95%) is forested with the upper catchment within the Kosciuszko National Park. Some water from the upper reaches of the river is diverted into Tantangara Reservoir via an aqueduct, but otherwise the river is not dammed.

In 1968 the National Capital Development Commission considered building a dam at Brindabella Valley for the purpose of sending water into the Cotter River via a tunnel.

The bridge over the Goodradigbee at Wee Jasper was completed in 1896 and is heritage-listed as being an early example of an Allan type timber truss road bridge. 

An alternative name for the river was 'Little River' and it was officially known as "Goodradigbee (or Little) River", until 22 May 1970.

See also

 
 List of rivers of New South Wales (A–K)

References

External links
 

Rivers of New South Wales
Rivers in the Riverina
Tributaries of the Murrumbidgee River
Snowy Mountains